Kumareyka is a village (selo) in Balagansky District of Irkutsk Oblast, Russia.

Rural localities in Irkutsk Oblast